Vivaldi Technologies AS is a Norwegian software development company, most known for its creation of the Vivaldi Browser. Headquartered in Oslo, Norway, it was founded in 2013 by Jon von Tetzchner and Tatsuki Tomita. Tetzchner was one of the founders, and formerly the CEO, of Opera Software, a software company which developed the web browser Opera. About 20 former Opera employees joined him at Vivaldi Technologies. In January 2017, the company had 35 employees. As of September 2021, the company has listed 54 employees.

Workspaces
The company is headquartered in Oslo, Norway, has the Innovation House in Reykjavík, Iceland, and a workspace in the Innovation House in Gloucester, Massachusetts, US. They also have developers in Helsinki, Finland; Saint Petersburg, Russia; Prague, Czech Republic, and other locations.

Products

Vivaldi.net

Vivaldi.net is a community-based platform that was originally launched in January 2014, which was created as a replacement to My Opera, due to the latter's planned closure in May 2014. The platform though has since been expanded to offer additional services that were not offered by My Opera - some designed particularly to work in tandem with the Vivaldi browser:
Vivaldi Blogs: a blogging platform where users can create their own blog and publish articles for free.
Vivaldi Webmail: an online email service that provides a free email account with 5 GB of storage.
Vivaldi Forum: a forum to discuss Vivaldi's development, request features, and leave feedback for the browser.
Vivaldi Sync: a means to synchronise bookmarks, settings, and history for the Vivaldi browser.
Vivaldi Themes: a platform designed to share and find user created themes for the Vivaldi browser.
Vivaldi Social: a Mastodon instance to connect to the Fediverse.

Vivaldi Browser

Vivaldi Technologies main product is the Vivaldi Browser. The browser was created in part to cater to power users after Opera Software opted to abandon its own browser engine Presto in favor of WebKit (and later Blink), thereby dropping support of many of its features.

In January 2015, the first technical preview of the browser was released. In November 2015, the first beta version of the browser was released.

In April 2016, Vivaldi Technologies released Vivaldi 1.0, the first stable version of the browser.

In September 2019, Vivaldi Technologies released the first beta version of Vivaldi for Android.

In April 2020, Vivaldi Technologies released Vivaldi 3.0, the first stable version of Vivaldi for Android.

Vivaldi Mail

In addition to the browser, Vivaldi Technologies also develops an email client, calendar, and a feed reader that are directly integrated as a component of the browser. Prior to the release of the browser, the company made the promise to integrate an email client, as a means to build "Opera as it should have been", which also integrated an email client into the Opera browser before becoming a separate product.

In November 2020, the first technical preview of the email client, calendar, and feed reader were released. In June 2021, beta versions of these components were released.

In June 2022, Vivaldi Technologies released Vivaldi Mail 1.0, the first stable version of the email client, calendar, and feed reader components.

References

Companies based in Massachusetts
Companies based in Oslo
Norwegian companies established in 2013
Software companies established in 2013
Software companies of Norway